Elizabeth Moreau is a reporter and host for Fox Sports South. In addition to her work with Fox, she is also a host at the ACC digital network.

Biography
Moreau graduated from Brebeuf Jesuit Preparatory School, Indianapolis, Indiana in 2000.  She was a four-year varsity letter winner in Women's Volleyball, and earned first team all-county and all-state honors and other awards for her volleyball skills.   After graduation, she attended Butler University in Indianapolis, where she was a political science and public relations major.  She also continued playing Women's Volleyball as a scholarship athlete and was four-year letter winner until her graduation in 2005.

In 2009, Pranknet leader "Dex" was responsible for an October 21 hoax in which he phoned Moreau, tricking her into breaking windows in her room at the Hilton Garden Inn in Gainesville, Florida.  He then initiated a conference call with a front desk employee at the hotel, where he then claimed he was Moreau's boyfriend and that the damage was a result of them fighting, as well as making a number of vulgar statements.  As a result of the hoax, a Gainesville Police detective was assigned to the case.

Professional career
After graduation from Butler, Moreau began a career in sports reporting.  She initially worked at the Big Ten Network as a production assistant, and later worked as a sideline reporter for Big Ten football and basketball and as a studio analyst for volleyball.   She then moved to ESPN as a college football sideline reporter, volleyball analyst, and track and field reporter.

Currently, Moreau  works for Fox Sports South as a host and social media reporter for SEC Gridiron Live, a sideline reporter for Southeastern Conference (SEC) football coverage, and a social media reporter for the Atlanta Braves Live pre and postgame show.

References

External links
  Elizabeth Moreau on Twitter

Living people
American television reporters and correspondents
Fox Sports Networks
1982 births